Ieva Serapinaitė (born 4 February 1995) is a Lithuanian modern pentathlete. She began competing in 2009 and won the World Youth Championships title in 2012 and 2013. As a senior, she won a silver medal in the team relay at the 2015 World Championships and placed 29th at the 2016 Rio Olympics.

References

External links

 
 
 
 
 

1995 births
Living people
Lithuanian female modern pentathletes
World Modern Pentathlon Championships medalists
Modern pentathletes at the 2016 Summer Olympics
Olympic modern pentathletes of Lithuania